John Bradfield (or John de Bradfield) was a medieval Bishop of Rochester.

Bradfield is believed to have come from Bradfield in Berkshire. He was a monk of Rochester Cathedral and precentor of Rochester before he was elected to the see of Rochester in 1278. He was consecrated on 29 May 1278. He died on 23 April 1283.

Citations

References

 

1283 deaths
13th-century English Roman Catholic bishops
Bishops of Rochester
People from Bradfield, Berkshire
Year of birth unknown